Rodolfo Arpon (born 10 April 1944) is a Filipino boxer. He competed at the 1964 Summer Olympics and the 1968 Summer Olympics. At the 1964 Summer Olympics, he defeated Børge Krogh and James Dunne, before losing to Ronald Harris.

References

External links
 

1944 births
Living people
Filipino male boxers
Olympic boxers of the Philippines
Boxers at the 1964 Summer Olympics
Boxers at the 1968 Summer Olympics
People from Leyte (province)
Asian Games medalists in boxing
Boxers at the 1966 Asian Games
Asian Games gold medalists for the Philippines
Medalists at the 1966 Asian Games
Lightweight boxers